Bersola is a Filipino surname. Notable people with the surname include:

Christine Bersola-Babao (born 1970), Filipino journalist
Katherine Adrielle R. Bersola (born 1996), Filipino volleyball player